The Other ANZACs: Nurses at War 1914-1918 is a 2008 history book by Peter Rees. It is about the involvement of Australian and New Zealand nurses overseas during World War I, especially at Gallipoli and the Western Front. It is the basis for the 2014 ABC television series ANZAC Girls.

To tie in with the television series it was reissued in 2014 under the title ANZAC Girls.

Contents
Author's note
Introduction
Gallipoli
The Marquette
The Western Front
Australian World War I nurses honour roll
New Zealand World War I nurses honour roll
Notes
Bibliogryaphy
Acknowledgements
Index

Publication history
2008, The Other ANZACs: Nurses at War 1914-1918, Australia, Allen & Unwin 
2014, Anzac Girls: The Extraordinary Story of World War One Nurses, Australia, Allen & Unwin

Reception
A review on H-Net of The Other ANZACs called it "a wonderful book", and a reviewer for The Sydney Morning Herald found it a "profoundly moving book" that "tells an unforgettable story of the courage of Australian and New Zealand nurses in World War I."

It was shortlisted for the 2009 ACT Book of the Year.

The 2014 ABC television series ANZAC Girls is based on this book.

References

2008 non-fiction books
History of nursing
Books about Australian history
Works about the Gallipoli campaign
ANZAC
Books about New Zealand
Works about women in war
History books about World War I
Books adapted into television series